Friends with Benefits (stylized as friends ♥♥ith benefits) is an American romantic sitcom television series created by Scott Neustadter and Michael H. Weber that aired on NBC from August 5 to September 9, 2011. The series ended after twelve episodes aired with the thirteenth being only available on iTunes, Amazon.com, and Netflix (until March 31, 2018).

Plot
The series follows a group of friends living in Chicago. It involves a very close friendship between two of the friends, who are each looking for the perfect mate, and the others who question their relationship, but at the same time, have their own romantic problems to deal with.

Cast
 Ryan Hansen as Ben Lewis, an office drone who is in no rush to find the right girl for him. He has been sleeping with his friend, Sara.
 Danneel Harris as Sara Maxwell, an OB/GYN and Ben's closest friend. Unlike Ben, she is desperate to find the right guy.
 Jessica Lucas as Riley Elliot, a bartender and Sara's roommate.  She is laid-back and lives a very casual love life.
 Zach Cregger as Aaron Greenway, a rich, nerdy engineer who wants to meet women but has trouble interacting with them.
 Andre Holland as Julian 'Fitz' Fitzgerald, Aaron's roommate. He takes it upon himself to help Aaron with women and keep the group on good terms with each other.

Production and development
Friends with Benefits was originally developed for ABC with a script order given by the network in September 2009. However, the network did not green-light a pilot for the potential series, allowing NBC to pick up the project. For the pilot episode, Fran Kranz was originally cast as Aaron, and Ian Reed Kesler portrayed Hoon (another version of Fitz).  The series was officially picked up on May 16, 2010.

Episodes
All episode titles (apart from the pilot episode) begin with the phrase "The Benefit of..."

Nielson Ratings
The shows first episode had a 0.7 rating in the 18-49 demographic with 2.34 million total viewers. As the series progressed it declined to a rating of 0.5 with 1.54 million viewers.

References

External links
 
 

2010s American single-camera sitcoms
2011 American television series debuts
2011 American television series endings
English-language television shows
NBC original programming
Television series by 20th Century Fox Television
Television shows set in Chicago
2010s American romantic comedy television series
2010s American sex comedy television series
Television series by Imagine Entertainment